Ronald Center (2 April 1913 – 18 April 1973) was a Scottish composer.

Biography
Center was born in Aberdeen where he studied piano under Julian Rosetti and organ under Willan Swainson. In 1943 he moved to Huntly, Aberdeenshire as music master of Huntly Gordon School for a period of six years, before turning to private teaching and composition. He remained in Huntly for the rest of his life.

From 1944 onwards, his works were broadcast by the BBC, particularly in their Modern Scottish Composers series. He performed many of his song settings with his wife, the soprano Evelyn Center (Morrison), and also gave piano recitals. His symphonic poem The Coming of Cuchulain was  given by the Scottish Orchestra under Warwick Braithwaite.

Works
Center's music draws on Scottish folk idioms, particularly the coronach and the reel.  Notable works include the symphonic poem The Coming of Cuchulain and the choral piece Dona Nobis Pacem.

A revival of interest in Center's works in the late 1970s led to a piano recital in the Mitchell Hall of Marischal College, Aberdeen, on 14 October 1977 and an orchestral concert in King's College Chapel, Old Aberdeen on 10 March 1978.  In May 1979, Thurso Choral Society performed the Contata and the Scottish Baroque Ensemble played Lacrimae in Aberdeen.  In Bogotá, Colombia, Center's Requiem Mass was sung nine times between August and December and, in November, a Scottish Festival celebrated Center in ten concerts and recitals.  In 1980, Ronald Stevenson played the Piano Sonata in Leeds.

Orchestral and strings
Symphony No. 1
The Coming of Cuchulain
Divertimento
Sinfonietta
Nocturne
Lacrimae
Elegy

Chamber
String Quartet No. 1
String Quartet No. 2
String Quartet No. 3
Violin Sonata
Suite for solo violoncello
Dance Rustique for violoncello and piano
Duo for violin and violoncello (also violin and bassoon, oboe and violoncello, oboe and bassoon)
Little Canon for violin and violoncello

Piano

Sonata
Sonatine
Suite
Three Movements
Larghetto
Pantomime in 3 movements
Prelude, Aria and Finale
6 Bagatelles
3 Preludes and Fugues
Three Studies
From Childhood
Rumba
Prelude
Toccata
Giglot
Burlesca
Homage
Impromptu
Air
Sarabande
Melodie
Molto Allegro
2 Andantes
Phantasy

Recordings
Ronald Center: Instrumental and Chamber Music, Vol. I: Music for Solo Piano Piano Sonata, 6 Bagatelles, and world premiere recordings of Pantomime, Andante, Sarabande, Air, Larghetto, Sonatine, Hommage, Three Etudes, Impromptu,Three Movements for Piano.  Christopher Guild, piano.  TOCC0179.  Release date: 2 September 2013.
Center of Huntly  String Quartet No. 2,  Violin Sonata,  Piano Sonata. Emily White and the Isla Quartet. Deveron Arts CD 8 80992 14514 5

References

External links
 Biographical page at Bardic-music.com, accessed 12 December 2011
 Huntly Deveron Arts page
 Essay on Center by James Naughtie 17 June 1978, accessed 12 December 2011
 National Library of Scotland R Center inventory, accessed 12 December 2011

1913 births
1973 deaths
20th-century classical composers
20th-century Scottish musicians
British male classical composers
People from Aberdeen
People from Huntly
Scottish classical composers
20th-century British composers
20th-century British male musicians